On 20 June 2013, a suicide bomber blew himself up at a Shiite mosque, killing 15 people and injuring over 20. The attack happened in the Shiite area known as Gulshan Colony. The attacker is believed to have been a Sunni Muslim. Three people were suspected of carrying out the attacks. The perpetrators first gunned down a police officer and a security guard, before the suicide bomber went into the mosque. There were reportedly around 300 people worshiping inside the mosque. The president of Pakistan, Asif Ali Zardari, commented about the attack saying, "Such cowardly and heinous acts by the militants cannot weaken the nation's resolve to pursue its struggle against militancy."

See also
Terrorist incidents in Pakistan in 2013

References

2013 murders in Pakistan
21st-century mass murder in Pakistan
Suicide bombings in 2013
Massacres in religious buildings and structures
Attacks on Shiite mosques in Pakistan
Mass murder in 2013
Suicide bombings in Peshawar
Terrorist incidents in Pakistan in 2013
Mosque bombings in Pakistan
Islamic terrorist incidents in 2013